Outgoing Long-wave Radiation (OLR) is electromagnetic radiation of wavelengths from 3–100 μm emitted from Earth and its atmosphere out to space in the form of thermal radiation. It is also referred to as up-welling long-wave radiation and terrestrial long-wave flux, among others. The flux of energy transported by outgoing long-wave radiation is measured in W/m2 or W⋅m−2. Infrared radiation of Earth is 239 W⋅m−2, one of two outgoing energy values of Earth's energy budget, the other being the reflected energy of 102 W⋅m−2, and effectively being the 255 K calculated blackbody temperature of Earth. In the Earth's climate system, long-wave radiation involves processes of absorption, scattering, and emissions from atmospheric gases, aerosols, clouds and the surface.

Over 99% of outgoing long-wave radiation has wavelengths between 4 μm and 100 μm, in the thermal infrared part of the electromagnetic spectrum. Contributions with wavelengths larger than 40 μm are small, therefore often only wavelengths up to 50 μm are considered . In the wavelength range between 4 μm and 10 μm the spectrum of outgoing long-wave radiation overlaps that of solar radiation, and for various applications different cut-off wavelengths between the two may be chosen.

Radiative cooling by outgoing long-wave radiation is the primary way the Earth System loses energy. The balance between this loss and the energy gained by radiative heating from incoming solar shortwave radiation determines global heating or cooling of the Earth system (Energy budget of Earth's climate). Local differences between radiative heating and cooling provide the energy that drives atmospheric dynamics.

Atmospheric energy balance

OLR is a critical component of the Earth's energy budget, and represents the total radiation going to space emitted by the atmosphere.  OLR contributes to the net all-wave radiation for a surface which is equal to the sum of shortwave and long-wave down-welling radiation minus the sum of shortwave and long-wave up-welling radiation. The net all-wave radiation balance is dominated by long-wave radiation during the night and during most times of the year in the polar regions. Earth's radiation balance is quite closely achieved since the OLR very nearly equals the Shortwave Absorbed Radiation received at high energy from the sun. Thus, the Earth's average temperature is very nearly stable. The OLR balance is affected by clouds and dust in the atmosphere. Clouds tend to block penetration of long-wave radiation through the cloud and increases cloud albedo, causing a lower flux of long-wave radiation into the atmosphere. This is done by absorption and scattering of the wavelengths representing long-wave radiation since absorption will cause the radiation to stay in the cloud and scattering will reflect the radiation back to earth. The atmosphere generally absorbs long-wave radiation well due to absorption by water vapour, carbon dioxide, and ozone. Assuming no cloud cover, most long-wave up-welling radiation travels to space  through the atmospheric window occurring in the electromagnetic wavelength region between 8 and 11 μm where the atmosphere does not absorb long-wave radiation except for in the small region within this between 9.6 and 9.8 μm. The interaction between up-welling long wave radiation and the atmosphere is complicated due to absorption occurring at all levels of the atmosphere and this absorption depends on the absorptivities of the constituents of the atmosphere at a particular point in time.

Role in greenhouse effect
The reduction of the surface long-wave radiative flux drives the greenhouse effect. Greenhouse gases, such as methane (CH4), nitrous oxide (N2O), water vapor (H2O) and carbon dioxide (CO2), absorb certain wavelengths of OLR, preventing the thermal radiation from reaching space, adding heat to the atmosphere. Some of this thermal radiation is directed back towards the Earth by scattering, increasing the average temperature of the Earth's surface. Therefore, an increase in the concentration of a greenhouse gas may contribute to global warming by increasing the amount of radiation that is absorbed and emitted by these atmospheric constituents. If the absorptivity of the gas is high and the gas is present in a high enough concentration, the absorption bandwidth becomes saturated.  In this case, there is enough gas present to completely absorb the radiated energy in the absorption bandwidth before the upper atmosphere is reached, and adding a higher concentration of this gas will have no additional effect on the energy budget of the atmosphere.

The OLR is dependent on the temperature of the radiating body.  It is affected by the Earth's skin temperature, skin surface emissivity, atmospheric temperature, water vapor profile, and cloud cover.

OLR measurements

Measuring outgoing long-wave radiation at the top of atmosphere and down-welling long-wave radiation back towards the surface is important for understanding how much energy is kept in Earth's climate system; for example how thermal radiation cools and warms the surface, and how this energy is distributed to affect the development of clouds.  Observing this radiative flux from a surface also provides a practical way of assessing surface temperatures at both local and global scales.

Outgoing long-wave radiation (OLR) has been monitored and reported since 1970 by an ongoing progression of satellite missions and instruments. Earliest observations were with infrared interferometer spectrometer and radiometer (IRIS) instruments developed for the Nimbus program and deployed on Nimbus-3 and Nimbus-4.  These Michelson interferometers were designed to span wavelengths of 5-25 microns.   Improved measurements were obtained starting with the Earth Radiation Balance (ERB) instruments on Nimbus-6 and Nimbus-7. 
These were followed by the Earth Radiation Budget Experiment) scanners and the non scanner on NOAA-9, NOAA-10 and Earth Radiation Budget Satellite; the Clouds and the Earth's Radiant Energy System instruments aboard Aqua, Terra, Suomi-NPP and NOAA-20; and the Geostationary Earth Radiation Budget instrument (GERB) instrument on the Meteosat Second Generation (MSG) satellite.

Down-welling long-wave radiation at the surface is mainly measured by Pyrgeometer.  A most notable ground-based network for monitoring surface long-wave radiation is Baseline Surface Radiation Network (BSRN), which provides crucial well-calibrated measurements for studying global dimming and brightening.

OLR calculation and simulation 

Many applications call for calculation of long-wave radiation quantities: the balance of global incoming shortwave to outgoing long-wave radiative flux determines the Energy budget of Earth's climate;  local radiative cooling by outgoing long-wave radiation (and heating by shortwave radiation) drive the temperature and dynamics of different parts of the atmosphere. By using the radiance measured from a particular direction by an instrument, atmospheric properties (like temperature or humidity) can be inversely inferred.
Calculations of these quantities solve the radiative transfer equations that describe radiation in the atmosphere. Usually the solution is done numerically by atmospheric radiative transfer codes adapted to the specific problem.

Another common approach is to estimate values using surface temperature and emissivity, then compare to satellite top-of-atmosphere radiance or brightness temperature.

See also
 Shortwave radiation
 Effective temperature

References

External links
 NOAA Climate Diagnostics Center
 NASA Earth Observatory Outgoing Heat Radiation
 
 
 Planetary Energy Balance, Physical Geography

Climatology